John Lucas (27 June 1869 – 25 November 1953) was an Australian rules footballer who played with Geelong in the Victorian Football League (VFL).

Notes

External links 

1869 births
1953 deaths
Australian rules footballers from Victoria (Australia)
Geelong Football Club players